The 1936–37 National Hurling League was the tenth edition of the National Hurling League, which ran from 4 October 1936 until 18 April 1937.

The nine participating teams were Clare, Cork, Dublin, Galway, Kilkenny, Laois, Limerick, Tipperary and Waterford who agreed to play an eight game format whereby each team would play each of their eight rivals once with two points awarded for a win and one point awarded for a drawn game. The team with most points at the completion of the season would be declared National Hurling League champions.

Limerick completed their eight game programme with just one defeat and were declared the champions for the fourth successive year while Clare finished with the fewest points, however, they were not relegated the following season.

National Hurling League

Table

Results

External links
 1936-37 National Hurling League

References

1935-36
League
League